Gradinje or Gradina, known in Bulgarian as Gradine or Gradini is a village located in the municipality of Dimitrovgrad, Serbia. As of the 2011 census, the village has a population of 204 inhabitants, most of whom were Bulgarians. A border crossing between Serbia and Bulgaria is located in the village.

References

Populated places in Pirot District
Bulgaria–Serbia border crossings